The 1994 Alcorn State Braves football team represented Alcorn State University as a member of the Southwestern Athletic Conference (SWAC) during the 1994 NCAA Division I-AA football season. Led by head fourth-year head coach Cardell Jones, the Braves compiled an overall record of 8–3–1 with a mark of 6–1 in conference play, sharing the SWAC title with Grambling State. Alcorn State advanced to the NCAA Division I-AA Football Championship playoffs, where they lost to the eventual national champion, Youngstown State, in the first round.

Quarterback Steve McNair won the Walter Payton Award as most outstanding offensive player in NCAA Division I-AA. He was the second, following Jerry Rice, and most recent I-AA player to earn a trip to New York City as a finalist for presentation of the Heisman Trophy. McNair finished third in the voting for the Heisman behind the winner, Rashaan Salaam, and runner-up Ki-Jana Carter.

Schedule

References

Alcorn State
Alcorn State Braves football seasons
Southwestern Athletic Conference football champion seasons
Alcorn State Braves football